The  is an organization of Japanese lyricists, established in June 1965. Since 1968 it holds the annual Japan Lyricist Awards.

Presidents 
 Hachirō Satō (1967–1975)
 Kō Fujiura (1975–1984)
 Sō Nishizawa (1984–1988)
 Miyuki Ishimoto (1988–1996)
 Tetsurō Hoshino (1996–2008)
 Reiko Yukawa (2008–2012)
 Ryūichi Satomura (2012–)
Between 1965 and 1967, Tetsurō Fujima was the organization's representative.

Selected list of vice presidents 
 Osamu Yoshioka

See also 
 Japan Lyricist Award
 Japan Composer's Association

References

External links 
 Japan Lyricists Association official website 

Arts organizations established in 1965
 
Music organizations based in Japan
Japanese writers' organizations